Laura Navarro Barrios is a Spanish field hockey player. She competed in the 2020 Summer Olympics.

References

External links

2000 births
Living people
Field hockey players at the 2020 Summer Olympics
Spanish female field hockey players
Olympic field hockey players of Spain